Raymond Claude "Ray" Moreton (30 January 1942 – 20 July 2016) was a New Zealand rugby union player. He was a member of the New Zealand national side, the All Blacks, from 1962 to 1965, playing in 12 matches including seven internationals, and scoring seven tries and one drop goal in all.

References

1942 births
2016 deaths
Rugby union players from Invercargill
People educated at Southland Boys' High School
New Zealand rugby union players
New Zealand international rugby union players
Southland rugby union players
Canterbury rugby union players
Rugby union centres